The Arizona Wildcat is a lost 1927 American silent Western film directed by Roy William Neill and starring Tom Mix, Dorothy Sebastian and Ben Bard.

Cast
 Tom Mix as Tom Phelan 
 Dorothy Sebastian as Regina Schyler  
 Ben Bard as Wallace Van Acker  
 Cissy Fitzgerald as Mother Schyler  
 Bill Elliott as Roy Schyler 
 Monte Collins as Low Jack Wilkins  
 Doris Dawson as Marie 
 Marcella Daly as Helen Van Acker

References

Bibliography 
 Jensen, Richard D. The Amazing Tom Mix: The Most Famous Cowboy of the Movies. 2005.

External links 
 

1927 films
1927 Western (genre) films
1920s English-language films
Films directed by Roy William Neill
American black-and-white films
Fox Film films
Silent American Western (genre) films
1920s American films